[[File:Melhuset (3).JPG|thumb|Gaulas offices are on the second floor of the Melhuset office building in Melhus.|250px]]Gaula''' is a local Norwegian newspaper, published on Wednesdays in Melhus in Sør-Trøndelag county.<ref name="SNL">[https://snl.no/Gaula_-_avis Gaula – avis.]</ref> It also covers news from the neighboring municipality of Midtre Gauldal, and from the former municipalities of Leinstrand and Byneset in Trondheim. The newspaper was established in 2001. Its editor is Åsmund Snøfugl and it is published on Wednesdays. The newspaper's offices are located in the Melhuset office building in downtown Melhus.

Circulation
According to the Norwegian Audit Bureau of Circulations and National Association of Local Newspapers, Gaula has had the following annual circulation:

References

Weekly newspapers published in Norway
Norwegian-language newspapers
Mass media in Trøndelag
Melhus
Publications established in 2001
2001 establishments in Norway